Bélavár is a village in Somogy county, Hungary.

Etymology
Its name consists of two worlds. Béla is a Hungarian person name. Bélavár could be the name of a castle of a person called Béla near the settlement.

References

External links 
 Street map (Hungarian)

Populated places in Somogy County
Hungarian German communities in Somogy County
Hungarian Croatian communities in Somogy County